Weso may refer to:

 WESO, a Catholic radio station in Southbridge, Massachusetts, United States
 Weso, Nevada, United States, an unincorporated community

See also
 Wesa
 WESA (disambiguation)